Stephen Lee Mansfield (born 1958) is an American author who writes about history, modern culture, religion and men's issues. His books have appeared on the New York Times best-seller list.

Life and career
Mansfield was born in Columbus, Georgia, the son of a U.S. Army officer, Eldon L. Mansfield Jr. His family lived on military posts around the United States, though the majority of his early years were spent in Germany, particularly in Berlin during the years when that city was divided into communist and free sectors.

Mansfield earned a bachelor's degree in history and philosophy from Oral Roberts University in 1981, a master's degree in history and public policy from Abilene Christian University, and a doctorate in history and literature from Whitefield Theological Seminary in 1996.

He was a pastor for 22 years, including 10 years at Belmont Church in Nashville, Tennessee, from 1992 to 2002, after which he began his formal writing career.

The Faith of George W. Bush, the first of his books to appear on the New York Times bestseller list, was published in 2003. The book was also a source for Oliver Stone's biographical film about George W. Bush, entitled W.

Mansfield followed his book about Bush with a number of biographies and cultural studies, authoring a total of more than 30 books.

He released The Miracle of the Kurds just as Kurdish troops were taking a stand against ISIS in the Middle East. The book has been named “Book of the Year” by Rudaw, the leading Kurdish news service. In 2016, Mansfield gave a TEDx talk entitled The Kurds: The World’s Most Famous Unknown People. He continues to speak in the U.S. and abroad in support of the Kurdish cause.

Mansfield has also become an outspoken advocate for the cause of noble manhood. In 2013, he released Mansfield’s Book of Manly Men, which has inspired men's events in the U.S. and Asia.

In addition to his work as an author and speaker, he has founded The Mansfield Group, a consulting firm based in Washington, DC, and Chartwell Literary Group, a firm that manages and creates literary projects. He is married to songwriter and producer Beverly Darnall Mansfield. They make their home in both Nashville, Tennessee, and Washington, DC.

Books by Stephen Mansfield
  Gold Medallion Book Award Finalist
 
 
 
 
 
  New York Times Bestseller, Audie Award Finalist, Retailers Choice Award Winner
 
 
 
 
 
 
 
 
  2010 Retailers Choice Award Winner

References 

1958 births
Living people
American non-fiction writers
Writers from Columbus, Georgia
Oral Roberts University alumni